The Juno Awards of 1985, representing Canadian music industry achievements of the previous year, were awarded on 4 November 1985 in Toronto. The ceremony was hosted by Andrea Martin and Martin Short at the Harbour Castle Hilton Hotel.

New categories for R&B/Soul and Reggae/Calypso were introduced this year. Nominations in secondary categories (children's, video, producer, recording engineer, classical and jazz) were announced 27 September 1985.

The ceremonies were broadcast nationally on CBC Television from 7pm Eastern Time. These included performances by Liberty Silver, Kim Mitchell and a duet of Tina Turner and Bryan Adams. Prime Minister Brian Mulroney was also in attendance.

Earlier in 1985, most major Canadian music artists joined each other to create the benefit single "Tears Are Not Enough". It was not represented among the year's Juno nominations although it demonstrated strength in the Canadian music industry.

This marked the first year that a black female was awarded a Juno: Liberty Silver.

Nominees and winners

Female Vocalist of the Year
Winner: Luba

Other nominees:
 Lee Aaron
 Dalbello
 Anne Murray
 Carole Pope

Male Vocalist of the Year
Winner: Bryan Adams

Other nominees:
 Bruce Cockburn
 Gowan
 Corey Hart
 Kim Mitchell

Most Promising Female Vocalist of the Year
Winner: k.d. lang

Other nominees:
 Connie Kaldor
 Belinda Metz
 Liberty Silver
 Vanity

Most Promising Male Vocalist of the Year
Winner: Paul Janz

Other nominees:
 Claude Dubois
 Daniel Lavoie
 Johnnie Lovesin
 Johnny MacLeod

Group of the Year
Winner: The Parachute Club

Other nominees:
 Helix
 Honeymoon Suite
 Strange Advance
 Triumph

Most Promising Group of the Year
Winner: Idle Eyes

Other nominees:
 The Arrows
 The Box
 Images in Vogue
 Rational Youth

Composer of the Year
Winner: Bryan Adams and Jim Vallance

Other nominees:
 David Foster
 Corey Hart
 Luba
 Eddie Schwartz

Country Female Vocalist of the Year
Winner: Anne Murray

Other nominees:
 Carroll Baker
 Marie Bottrell
 Anne Lord
 Laura Vinson

Country Male Vocalist of the Year
Winner: Murray McLauchlan

Other nominees:
 Terry Carisse
 Ronnie Hawkins
 Terry Sumsion
 Valdy

Country Group or Duo of the Year
Winner: The Family Brown

Other nominees:
 C-Weed Band
 Kelita Haverland and Gilles Godard
 Midnite Rodeo Band
 Anita Perras and Tim Taylor

Instrumental Artist of the Year
Winner: Canadian Brass

Other nominees:
 Hagood Hardy
 Frank Mills
 The Spitfire Band
 Zamfir

Producer of the Year
Winner: David Foster, Chicago 17 by Chicago

Other nominees:
 Bryan Adams, Reckless by Bryan Adams
 Terry Brown, New Regime by New Regime
 Peter Cardinali, The Bear Walks by Hugh Marsh
 Declan O'Doherty, Idle Eyes by Idle Eyes
 Gino Vannelli, Black Cars by Gino Vannelli

Recording Engineer of the Year
Winner: Hayward Parrott, Underworld by The Front

Other nominees:
 Kevin Doyle, Claim to Fame by Robert Armes
 Kevin Doyle, Smalltown Girl by Target
 Gary Gray, The Bear Walks by Hugh Marsh
 Anton Kwiatkowski, Serenade in Harmony by Elmer Iseler Singers

Canadian Music Hall of Fame
Winner: Wilf Carter

Walt Grealis Special Achievement Award
Winner: A. Hugh Joseph

Nominated and winning albums

Album of the Year
Winner: Reckless, Bryan Adams

Other nominees:
 Boy in the Box, Corey Hart
 Honeymoon Suite, Honeymoon Suite
 Strange Animal, Gowan
 Walkin' the Razor's Edge, Helix

Best Album Graphics
Winner: Rob MacIntyre and Dimo Safari, Strange Animal by Gowan

Other nominees:
 Heather Brown, Secrets and Sins by Luba
 Heather Brown and Deborah Samuel, 2WO by Strange Advance
 Dean Motter, Metal for Breakfast by various artists
 James O'Mara, Idle Eyes by Idle Eyes
 Deborah Samuel, At the Feet of the Moon by The Parachute Club

Best Children's Album
Winner: Murmel Murmel Munsch, Robert Munsch

Other nominees:
 The Magic Singing Animal Farm, Brad McDonald, Frank Daller, David Waldon
 Music Builders VI, The Music Builders Chorus
 Snyder the Spider, Paul Hann
 Today's Special, Today's Special
 Wee Rockers, Wee Rockers

Best Classical Album of the Year - Solo or Chamber Ensemble
Winner: W.A. Mozart-String Quartets, The Orford String Quartet

Other nominees:
 Beethoven Violin and Piano Sonatas, Steven Staryk and John Parry
 Great French Organ Works, Mireille Lagace
 Pachelbel Cannon and Other Digital Delights, Andrew Davis and the Toronto Chamber Orchestra
 Mezzo Soprano, Catherine Robbin

Best Classical Album of the Year - Large Ensemble or Soloist(s) With Large Ensemble Accompaniment
Winner: Ravel: Ma Mere L'oye/Pavane Pour un Infante Debunte/Tombeau de Couperin And Valses Nobles et Sentimentales, l'Orchestre symphonique de Montreal, Charles Dutoit conductor

Other nominees:
 Berlioz: Symphonie Fantastique, l'Orchestre Symphonique de Montreal, Charles Dutoit conductor
 The Brandenburg Concertos, CBC Vancouver Orchestra, Mario Bernardi conductor
 Serenade in Harmony, Elmer Iseler
 Stravinsky: Le Sacre du Printemps, l'Orchestre Symphonique de Montreal, Charles Dutoit conductor

International Album of the Year
Winner: Born in the U.S.A., Bruce Springsteen

Other nominees:
 Like a Virgin, Madonna
 Make It Big, Wham!
 Private Dancer, Tina Turner
 Purple Rain, Prince

Best Jazz Album
Winner: A Beautiful Friendship, Don Thompson

Other nominees:
 Avenue B, The Bill King Quintet
 Free For Now, The Oliver Whitehead Quintet
 MacPherson, Fraser MacPherson
 The Many Moods of Oliver Jones, Oliver Jones

Nominated and winning releases

Best Selling Single
Winner: "Never Surrender", Corey Hart

Other nominees:
 "A Criminal Mind", Gowan
 "Black Cars", Gino Vannelli
 "Let It Go", Luba
 "Run to You", Bryan Adams

International Single of the Year
Winner: "I Want to Know What Love Is", Foreigner

Other nominees:
 "Careless Whisper", Wham!
 "I Just Called to Say I Love You", Stevie Wonder
 "Shout", Tears for Fears
 "Wake Me Up Before You Go-Go", Wham!

Best R&B/Soul Recording of the Year
Winner: "Lost Somewhere Inside Your Love", Liberty Silver

Other nominees:
 "Hit and Run Lover", Yvonne Moore
 "Mega Mix", Something Extra
 "Memories of Moments", Demo Cates
 "Two Can Play", Wayne St. John

Best Reggae/Calypso Recording
Winner: "Heaven Must Have Sent You", Liberty Silver and Otis Gayle

Other nominees:
 Camboulay Dub, Mojah
 Trade Winds '84, Trade Winds
 , Sattalites
 Higher Love, Syren

Best Video
Winner: Rob Quartly, "A Criminal Mind" by Gowan

Other nominees:
 Robert Bouvier, "Go For Soda" by Kim Mitchell
 Rob Quartly, "Never Surrender" by Corey Hart
 Rob Quartly, "You're a Strange Animal" by Gowan
 Deborah Samuel and Lorraine Segato, "At the Feet of the Moon" by The Parachute Club

References

External links
Juno Awards site

1985
1985 music awards
1985 in Canadian music